St. John's Lodge No. 1 A.Y.M. in New York City, United States, is the oldest operating Masonic Lodge under the jurisdiction of the Grand Lodge of New York Free and Accepted Masons. The lodge was originally warranted as St. John's Lodge No. 2 on December 7, 1757 by George Harison, Esq. of the Provincial Grand Lodge of New York under the Grand Lodge of England (Moderns).

History

The lodge originally met on Ann Street in New York City. In 1770, a fire destroyed St. John's Lodge room, along with their lodge jewels and furniture. A new set of by-laws was adopted in 1773 and was signed by 70 members of the lodge. The lodge purchased a new altar bible in November 1770 which was used in the first Presidential Inauguration and is now known as the George Washington Inaugural Bible. 

At the start of the American Revolutionary War in 1775, the members of St. John’s Lodge who supported the Colonies’ independence seized the lodge’s warrant, and fled New York City. These exiled members held gatherings at the Fishkill Supply Depot in Fishkill, NY until the end of the war in 1783, when they returned to New York City with the warrant, while many Masons who supported the British fled to Canada.

In 1789, St. John’s was acknowledged as the oldest Masonic lodge in New York State, and was designated as Number 1. A new charter was then conveyed to St. John’s Lodge, under which charter the lodge is still working.

Notable members
Edward Antill – Lt. Colonel in the Revolutionary War
Abraham Baldwin – First president of the University of Georgia
Joshua Bloomer – First graduate of King's College (now known as Columbia University)
Ebenezer Foote – Major in the Revolutionary War
Jacob Morton – Marshal for the First inauguration of George Washington
John Ramage – Miniature artist and Second Lieutenant in the Revolutionary War

Notes

External links
 St. John's Lodge No. 1 A.Y.M. Website
 The Grand Lodge of Free and Accepted Masons of New York
Masonic Lodges
Freemasonry in the United States
Masonic organizations